The Swedish Armed Forces Headquarters (HKV) is the highest level of command in the Swedish Armed Forces. Established in 1994, its primary task is to command operations, but is also involved in areas such as military strategy, the overall development of the Swedish Armed Forces, and acting as a channel of contact with government. It's located at Lidingövägen 24 at Gärdet in Stockholm.

History

1994–1998
On 1 July 1994 a major reorganization of the Swedish Armed Forces was carried out and of the then central staffs. From having consisted of more than a hundred different agencies, the Swedish Armed Forces was now organized into a single agency (Sweden's largest agency). The Defence Staff and the three military branch staffs, the Army Staff, Air Staff and the Naval Staff, were organized simultaneously into a joint headquarters. The then headquarters consisted of four commands; Joint Operations Command (Operationsledningen, OpL), Army Command (Arméledningen), Naval Command (Marinledningen) and Air Force Command (Flygvapenledningen) and three staffs: Planning Staff (Planeringsstaben), the Intelligence and Security Staff (Underrättelse- och säkerhetsstaben) and the Joint Staff (Gemensamma staben). The Joint Staff included a large number of more or less independent departments that was regarded as joint group support. That is, the headquarters has housed both staff parts and executive parts in so-called commands. The chiefs of the commands had also been known as Central Production Leaders (Centrala Produktionsledare, CPL). The CPL's have had under the Supreme Commander the responsibility for the development, maintenance and decommissioning of war units within specifically designated so-called programs (eg program 2 army units or program 7 naval ship units, etc.).

1998–2000
A new organization of the headquarters was adopted on 1 July 1998. The Army, Naval and Air Force Commands ceased to exist, as well as the positions of the Chief of Army Staff, Chief of Air Force Staff and Chief of Navy Staff. Its tasks were transferred to two newly created directorates within the headquarters; the Joint Forces Directorate (Krigsförbandsledningen) and the General Training and Management Directorate (Grundorganisationsledningen), and to three new "centers"; the Army Center in Enköping, the Navy Center at Berga and the Air Force Center in Uppsala. The Joint Operations Command (Operationsledningen, OpL) was also created, with responsibility for planning and leading operational operations within and outside Sweden, both in peace and in war, as well as for the war organization, its ability and preparedness. Two staffs were also created; the Planning Staff (Planeringsstaben) which was the agency's preparatory body to focus and prioritize the operations, and the Human Resources Staff (Personalstaben, PERSS), which was the agency's preparatory body for matters concerning human resources. In order to relieve the Supreme Commander, a special position as Deputy Supreme Commander was created. These two together constituted the executive group. The Deputy Supreme Commander led the headquarters efforts through the coordination of the operations. He also had the employer responsibility for the staff at the headquarters. To help to coordinate operations, he had a Coordination Department.

2000–2004
Through the Defence Act of 2000, the headquarters was reorganized again. The Joint Forces Command was established by, among other things, parts of the headquarters' Joint Operations Command. The Joint Forces Command came to consist of four parts: an operation command, the Army Tactical Command, the Naval Tactical Command and the Air Force Tactical Command. The Chief of Home Guard with staff functions were incorporated into the headquarters. The biggest and most important change in the headquarters was that the Strategic Plans and Policy Directorate (Strategiledningen) was established. It was created mainly by parts of the then Joint Operations Command and Planning Staff. The Strategic Plans and Policy Directorate would act as the agency's direction and planning body. In summary, the headquarters consisted of the agency's command staff, three units, namely, the Strategic Plans and Policy Directorate, the Joint Forces Directorate and the General Training and Management Directorate, and a staff unit, namely the Personnel Staff. In addition to these units, there were within the headquarters the Swedish Armed Forces Security Inspectorate (Försvarsmaktens säkerhetsinspektion), the Swedish Military Intelligence and Security Service and independent departments for, among other things, position presentation, coordination, law and administration.

In July 2002, a management investigation was completed which pointed to a number of problems that needed to be solved. This concerned important issues such as coordination of work processes within the Headquarters and management and follow-up of the units around the country. The investigation's proposal resulted, among other things, in the introduction of a commander of the Headquarters who would be responsible for and control the work processes in the central command. Other measures that were taken were that the then Inspectors General (Army Inspector General, Air Force Inspector General, Navy Inspector General) were included in the Headquarters' General Training and Management Directorate (Grundorganisationsledningen), and that new positions as Inspector of Communications and Information Systems (Ledningsinspektör) and Inspector of Training (Utbildningsinspektör) were established. Furthermore, the Joint Forces Command formally became part of the Headquarters. However, a proposal from the investigation to merge the Joint Forces Directorate (Krigsförbandsledningen) and the General Training and Management Directorate into a unit with overall responsibility for the annual production of units was not implemented. The investigation proposed that the Headquarters should be reduced by 240 positions. In January 2004, reductions of 170 positions had been implemented.

2005–2007
From 1 July 2005, the Headquarters had a process-oriented command structure. The Swedish Armed Forces would thereby have three main processes; the Utvecklings- och inriktningsprocessen, Produktionsprocessen and Insatsprocessen. In addition, there was a Ledningsprocessen and the Military Intelligence and Security Service with associated personnel. The biggest change with the new organization was that parts of the operations within the former Joint Forces Directorate (Krigsförbandsledningen) and the General Training and Management Directorate (Grundorganisationsledningen) were brought together in the Produktionsprocessen. In addition to this, there were various support units, e.g. the Kompetensförsörjningsprocessen and Ekonomiprocessen. Organizationally, the Headquarters consisted of a command unit of 191 people, another unit of 332 people and an operational unit of 228 people. The latter was located in Uppsala. In addition to the above units, an administrative unit of 107 people was added.

Current units

Defence Staff
The Defence Staff (Ledningsstaben, LEDS) handles major strategic issues, such as planning the Swedish Armed Forces' operations and financial control of the agency. The staff leads, coordinates and monitors the activities of the headquarters. The Defence Staff is in turn divided into departments with different responsibilities. The departments are: Plans and Finance Department (Planerings- och ekonomiavdelningen, LEDS PLANEK), Policy and Plans Department (Inriktningsavdelning, LEDS INRI), Communications Department (Kommunikationsavdelningen, LEDS KOMM), Chief Information Officer Department (CIO-avdelningen, LEDS CIO), Legal Department (Juridiska avdelningen, LEDS JUR), Human Resources Department (Personalavdelningen, LEDS PERS) and the Total Defence Department (Totalförsvarsavdelningen, LEDS TF). In addition, there is a staff department for coordination and support to the agency's management. The Chief of Defence Staff is also head of the headquarters. The Chief of Defence Staff has extensive duties and powers, for example with regard to international cooperation and international agreements. The Chief of Defence Staff has, in his support, a deputy head of the headquarters and the administrative headquarters department. The Chief of Defence Staff is currently Vice Admiral Jonas Haggren.

Communications Department
The Communications Department (Kommunikationsavdelningen, LEDS KOMM) is the central information function of the Swedish Armed Forces and is led by the Director of Communication and Public Affairs. From here, among other things, the Swedish Armed Forces recruitment communication is led, as well as media and crisis communication and the contents of the Swedish Armed Forces central channels such as the agency's website Forsvarsmakten.se, the magazine Försvarets forum and the agency's Twitter feed. The Communications Department also plans the information service for missions and exercises. The Director of Communication and Public Affairs is currently Brigadier General Peder Ohlsson.

Legal Department
The Legal Department (Juridiska avdelningen, LEDS JUR) provides legal support to all organizational units in the Swedish Armed Forces. The department consists of three sections: the Section for Operational law (Operativjuridiska sektionen, LEDS JUR OP), the Section for Civil Law (Civilrättsliga sektionen, LEDS JUR CIV), and the Section for Administrative Law (Förvaltningsjuridiska sektionen, LEDS JUR FÖRV). The department also administers the Office of the Swedish Armed Forces Personnel Responsibility Committee (Försvarsmaktens personalansvarsnämnds kansli, FPAN). The Chief Legal Advisor is Director of the Legal Department and is also the Swedish Armed Forces' head of administration (förvaltningschef). The Chief Legal Advisor is currently Carin Bratt.

Human Resources Department
The Human Resources Department's (Personalavdelningen, LEDS PERS) task is to develop, focus and manage the Swedish Armed Forces' strategic personnel supply. The Human Resources Department, which is led by the Director of Human Resources, develops and creates rules for the Swedish Armed Forces' systematic work environment. The staff is working on developing and creating rules for, among other things, gender equality, social equality, behavior change, physical training, and the veteran activities within the Swedish Armed Forces. The Director of Human Resources represents the Swedish Armed Forces in central employer issues with other agencies and organizations, and signs the Swedish Armed Forces' collective agreements. The Director of Human Resources is Kim-Lena Ekvall Svedenblad.

Training & Procurement Staff
The Training & Procurement Staff (Produktionsledningen, PROD) ensures that the Swedish Armed Forces have all the resources required to carry out operations. Its assignments include everything from recruitment and training of personnel to the development of equipment such as weapons, vehicles, ships, and aircraft. The Training & Procurement Staff has a broad area of responsibility which includes both supply of materiel and logistics as well as training of the Swedish Armed Forces' units. The Training & Procurement Staff's assignment is divided between departments with different areas of responsibility, such as the naval and aviation departments. The commanders of these departments are called stridskraftchefer ("combat forces commanders"): the Chief of Army, the Chief of Navy, the Chief of Air Force, the Chief of Defence Logistics, Chief of Communications and Information Systems (Ledningssystemchefen) and the Chief of Home Guard. The Chief of Armed Forces Training & Procurement is Lieutenant General Johan Svensson and he reports directly to the Supreme Commander. Sorting under the Chief of Armed Forces Training & Procurement, are all the Swedish Armed Forces' organizational units, i.e. all units, schools and centers, except the headquarters. Chief of Army is Major General Karl Engelbrektson. Chief of Air Force is Major General Carl-Johan Edström. The Chief of Communications and Information Systems (Ledningssystemchef) is Brigadier General Anna Eriksson. Chief of Navy is Rear Admiral Ewa Skoog Haslum. Chief of Home Guard is Major General Laura Swaan Wrede.

Joint Forces Command
The Joint Forces Command (JFC) (Insatsledningen, INS) commands the Swedish Armed Forces' missions on behalf of the Supreme Commander. Its assignment is to plan, command and follow up missions, both in Sweden and abroad. The Joint Forces Command is responsible for the Swedish Armed Forces' missions. This may involve, for example, international peacekeeping or peace enforcement missions, or detecting and rejecting aircraft or vessels that violate Swedish territory. The Joint Forces Command uses intelligence from the Swedish Military Intelligence and Security Service, to make their decisions. The Chief of Joint Operations is Lieutenant General Michael Claesson and he reports directly subordinate to the Supreme Commander. Sorting under the Chief of Joint Operations are a number of commanders with different responsibilities. The tasks of the commanders are, among other things, to command, plan and follow up missions and to support the Swedish society. War units are military units that are prepared to carry out operations and which are part of any of the Swedish Armed Forces' units, schools or centers. Responsibility is divided between the tactical commanders, the ground, naval and air forces, as well as the head of the Special Forces Command (SFL).

Military Intelligence and Security Service

The Swedish Military Intelligence and Security Service (MUST) conducts operations in the field of defense intelligence, military intelligence and military security service. It is the Swedish government and the Supreme Commander who are MUST's clients. Its headed by the Director of Military Intelligence and Security.

Safety Inspectorate
The Safety Inspectorate (Säkerhetsinspektionen, SÄKINSP) is an independent unit of the headquarters that is to independently review, control and exercise oversight of the operational security of the Swedish Armed Forces with regard to military ground security and military maritime security. The head of the Safety Inspectorate is directly subordinate to the Supreme Commander.

Safety Inspectorate (Aviation Authority)
The Safety Inspectorate (Aviation Authority) (Militära flyginspektionen, FLYGI) is an independent unit of the headquarters that is directly subordinate to the government in terms of questions of supervision. In other matters, the Safety Inspectorate (Aviation Authority) is under the command of the Supreme Commander. Its activities are led by the flygsäkerhetsinspektören.

Surgeon-General

The Surgeon-General of the Swedish Armed Forces, since 2017 called Försvarsinspektören för hälsa och miljö (FIHM) checks that the Swedish Armed Forces comply with laws and other regulations that apply to environmental and health protection, food safety, animal welfare, animal health service, animal health care, health care and infection protection.

Heraldry and traditions

Coat of arms
From 1994 to 2001, the Swedish Armed Forces Headquarters had the lesser coat of arms with a sword in gold as an heraldic arm. Blazon: "Azure, the lesser coat of arms of Sweden, three open crowns or placed two and one. The shield surmounting an erect sword of the last colour". This coat of arms was used by the Supreme Commander from 1991 to 1993 and is currently used by the Swedish Armed Forces since 1993. In 2001, the headquarters adopted a new coat of arms. Blazon: "Azure, an erect sword or. The shield surmounting two batons in saltire of the last colour, the batons charged with open crowns azure placed two and one."

Colours, standards and guidons
The colour of the Swedish Armed Forces Headquarters is a double swallow-tailed Swedish flag. The flag was presented to the former Defence Staff (Fst) in 1992.

Medals
In 2010, the Högkvarterets förtjänstmedalj ("Swedish Armed Forces Headquarters Medal of Merit") in gold and silver (HKVGM/SM) was established.

Commanding officers
In conjunction with the Swedish Armed Forces Headquarters reorganization in 1998, a special position was created as Deputy Supreme Commander to relieve the Supreme Commander of the Swedish Armed Forces. The Deputy Supreme Commander led the Headquarters work through coordination of the operations. He also exercised employer responsibility for the staff in the Headquarters. In order to coordinate the operations he had a Coordination Department. A formal position of chief of the Swedish Armed Forces Headquarters was established in 2002.

Heads
1998–2001: Frank Rosenius, as Deputy Supreme Commander
2001–2002: Hans Berndtson, as Deputy Supreme Commander
2002–2004: Johan Kihl, as Chief of the Strategic Plans and Policy Directorate and the Swedish Armed Forces Headquarters
2004–2005: Claes-Göran Fant, as Chief of the Strategic Plans and Policy Directorate and the Swedish Armed Forces Headquarters
2005–2007: Jörgen Ericsson, as Chief of Staff of the Swedish Armed Forces Headquarters
2007–2009: Sverker Göranson, as Chief of Defence Staff and Chief of Staff of the Swedish Armed Forces Headquarters
2009–2014: Jan Salestrand, as Chief of Defence Staff and head of the Swedish Armed Forces Headquarters
2014–2018: Dennis Gyllensporre, as Chief of Defence Staff and head of the Swedish Armed Forces Headquarters
2018–20xx: Jonas Haggren, as Chief of Defence Staff and head of the Swedish Armed Forces Headquarters

Deputy heads
11 December 2020–20xx: Colonel Mikael Åkerström

Names, designations and locations

Footnotes

References

Notes

Print

External links
 

Joint military units and formations of Sweden
Military units and formations established in 1994
Joint military headquarters
1994 establishments in Sweden
Stockholm Garrison